Mundo Lingo are free language social events that happen independently in various metropolises in different countries. They usually take place in the late evening during the week (7pm to midnight) in a specific bar. They gather many men and women of all ages and all nationalities that wish to learn or improve one or more languages.

Principle

Each participant receives flags to stick to their clothes. They are supposed to indicate their native language at the top, and the rest below (generally the languages they master and below the one they want to learn). Then, people are free to chat with each other while having drinks.

History

The first Mundo Lingo event was an initiative of UK born Benji Moreira when he was an immigrant in Buenos Aires (Argentina). It took place on July 7, 2011 and was aimed for local Argentines to learn foreign languages and for internationals to practice Spanish.
After a while, around 50 people per week were attending and the flag system was introduced. In 2014 the event grew increasingly popular and was exported to Cologne, London, Montreal, and then Melbourne.

Cities

As of September 2018, Mundo Lingo events regularly take place in up to 30 cities, 24 countries and 5 continents.

Asia
As of September 2018, Mundo Lingo events regularly take place in Saigon and Hanoi (Vietnam), Bangkok and Chiang Mai (Thailand), Nanjing (China), Osaka (Japan), Singapore and Yangon (Myanmar) .

Oceania
As of September 2018, Mundo Lingo events regularly take place in Melbourne, Sydney and Brisbane (Australia) and Wellington and Auckland (New Zealand).

Europe
As of September 2018, Mundo Lingo events regularly take place in Barcelona (Spain), Cologne, Stuttgart and Munich (Germany), Copenhagen (Denmark), Geneva (Switzerland), London (England), Paris (France) and Oslo (Norway).

America
As of September 2018, Mundo Lingo events regularly take place in Buenos Aires, Córdoba and La Plata (Argentina), Lima (Peru), Rio de Janeiro (Brazil), Montréal and Toronto (Canada), New York (United States).

Move to social networks after COVID-19

Mundo Lingo always relies on social networking. Due to the effects of the COVID-19 pandemic which forced the live events to be suspended until further notice, the subscribers to Facebook and Telegram groups began to increase dramatically instead. As of August 1, 2020, Facebook groups show a total of more than 135,000 subscribers worldwide  while Telegram groups show more than 12,000 daily users.

References

External links 
 Mundo Lingo

Language acquisition
Social events
Recurring events established in 2011